Askia Toussaint Booker (born August 31, 1993) is an American professional basketball player for the Shenzhen Leopards of the Chinese Basketball Association (CBA). He played college basketball for the Colorado Buffaloes as a point guard. In his senior year in 2014–15, he earned second-team all-conference honors in the Pac-12.

High school career
Booker attended Price High School. As a junior, he averaged 13 points, 7 rebounds and 5 assists to lead Price to the Division IV championship. He was ranked 30th in the nation at his position by ESPN.  Booker committed to the Colorado Buffaloes to play for Tad Boyle on October 29, 2010.

College career
As a freshman, Booker helped lead Colorado to the NCAA Tournament for the first time since the 2002–03 season. He averaged 9.1 points, 2.7 rebounds, and 1.4 assists in 21.5 minutes per game.

As a sophomore, Booker was one of two players to start all 33 games, along with Spencer Dinwiddie. He averaged 12.4 points, 2.2 assists, and 1.2 steals per game.

As a junior, he hit a buzzer beater against KU. He was named a Pac-12 honorable mention.

As a senior in 2014–15, Booker was voted second-team All-Pac-12. Although Colorado accepted an invitation to play in the College Basketball Invitational, Booker decided to skip the postseason tournament.

Professional career
After going undrafted in the 2015 NBA draft, Booker joined the Philadelphia 76ers for the 2015 NBA Summer League. On August 13, 2015, he signed with Arkadikos for the 2015–16 Greek Basket League season. However, he was released by Arkadikos in mid-October after appearing in just two games. On October 31, 2015, he was selected by the Maine Red Claws with the 10th overall pick in the 2015 NBA Development League Draft, only to be traded to the Bakersfield Jam in a three-team draft night deal. In 47 games for the Jam in 2015–16, he averaged 12.8 points, 3.1 rebounds and 3.5 assists per game.

In July 2016, Booker joined the Phoenix Suns for the 2016 NBA Summer League. On October 31, 2016, he was re-acquired by the now Northern Arizona Suns. In the team's season opener on November 12, 2016, Booker scored 15 points in a 122–106 win over the Iowa Energy.

On December 28, 2017, Booker was traded alongside a fourth round draft pick to the Delaware 87ers for Jerrelle Benimon.

On February 20, 2018, Booker signed a contract with Real Betis Energía Plus of the Spanish Liga ACB.

On July 24, 2018, Booker signed a one-year deal with UCAM Murcia of the Liga ACB.

On September 30, 2020, Booker signed with the Shenzhen Aviators of the Chinese Basketball Association.

Career statistics

Professional

Europe

|-
| align="left" | 2015–16
| align="left" |  Arkadikos B.C.
| 2 || 2 || 25.6 || .143 || .091 || 1.000 || 5.0 || 4.0 || 0.0 || 0.0 ||  5.0
|-
| align="left" | 2017–18
| align="left" |  Real Betis Energía Plus
| 14 || 10 || 24.2 || .479 || .255 || .875 || 2.6 || 2.7 || 0.6 || 0.0 ||  15.0
|-
| align="left" | 2018–19
| align="left" |  UCAM Murcia
| 33 || 18 || 21.1 || .446 || .363 || .727 || 2.4 || 2.4 || 0.8 || 0.0 ||  15.0
|-
| align="left" | 2019–20
| align="left" |  UCAM Murcia
| 19 || 19 || 28.3 || .414 || .372 || .842 || 2.5 || 3.6 || 0.5 || 0.1 ||  21.2
|-
|- class="sortbottom"
| colspan="2" style="text-align:center;"|Career
| 68 || 49 || 23.7 || .433 || .345 || .808 || 2.5 || 2.8 || 0.7 || 0.0 ||  16.4

NBA G League

|-
| align="left" | 2015–16
| align="left" | Bakersfield Jam
| 47 || 0 || 20.7 || .462 || .333 || .756 || 3.1 || 3.5 || 0.7 || 0.0 ||  12.8
|-
| align="left" | 2016–17
| align="left" | Northern Arizona Suns
| 42 || 40 || 31.7 || .396 || .347 || .709 || 4.0 || 5.3 || 1.2 || 0.1 ||  15.5
|-
| align="left" | 2017–18
| align="left" | Suns & 87ers
| 36 || 34 || 31.8 || .409 || .321 || .810 || 4.0 || 6.0 || 1.6 || 0.1 ||  15.6
|-

College

|-
| style="text-align:left;"|2011–12
| style="text-align:left;"|Colorado
| 35 || 1 || 21.5 || .402 || .372 || .762 || 2.7 || 1.4 || 0.7 || 0.0 || 9.1
|-
| style="text-align:left;"|2012–13
| style="text-align:left;"|Colorado
| 33 || 33 || 31.8 || .395 || .312 || .704 || 3.5 || 2.2 || 1.2 || 0.0 || 12.4
|-
| style="text-align:left;"|2013–14
| style="text-align:left;"|Colorado
| 35 || 35 || 30.5 || .389 || .272 || .818 || 3.7 || 3.3 || 1.3 || 0.1 || 13.7
|-
| style="text-align:left;"|2014–15
| style="text-align:left;"|Colorado
| 31 || 28 || 30.2 || .387 || .329 || .834 || 3.3 || 3.2 || 1.4 || 0.1 || 17.2
|-
|- class="sortbottom"
| colspan="2" style="text-align:center;"|Career
| 134 || 97 || 28.4 || .384 || .316 || .792 || 3.3 || 2.5 || 1.2 || 0.0 || 13.0

CBA

|-
| style="text-align:left;"|2020–21
| style="text-align:left;"|Shenzhen
| 39 || 38 || 34.0 || .481 || .427 || .765 || 5.0 || 7.6 || 1.0 || 0.1 || 26.2
|-
| style="text-align:left;"|2021–22
| style="text-align:left;"|Shenzhen
| 37 || 34 || 27.5 || .445 || .369 || .723 || 3.4 || 6.8 || 1.2 || 0.1 || 16.5

Source: basketball-stats.de (Date: 27. March 2022)

References

External links
 Colorado bio
 Basketball-Reference profile
 Askia Booker at basketball-stats.de

1993 births
Living people
American expatriate basketball people in Greece
American expatriate basketball people in Spain
American men's basketball players
Arkadikos B.C. players
Bakersfield Jam players
Basketball players from Los Angeles
CB Murcia players
Colorado Buffaloes men's basketball players
Delaware 87ers players
Liga ACB players
Northern Arizona Suns players
Point guards
Real Betis Baloncesto players
Basketball players from Inglewood, California